Gonzo's Quest is an online video slot game for desktop and mobile browsers, released in 2011. Gonzo's Quest was the first platinum game of NetEnt, a global publisher, developer, and host of online casino software and games. The game has been described as a "medium variance slot". A subsidiary of NetEnt called Red Tiger Gaming created Gonzo’s Quest Megaways which uses the same game mechanics as the original, which was released in 2020.

Premise 
Gonzo the conquistador arrives at the Peruvian coast in a galleon. He then steals a treasure map and sets in search of El Dorado, the lost city of gold. 

The character's looks and name are based on Gonzalo Pizarro, a 16th-century Spanish conquistador and the brother of the more famous Francisco, conqueror of the Inca Empire.

Gameplay 
The game uses 3D graphics and a pastel palette.  In the gameplay itself, there are eight different symbols in the reels: Fire, Alligator, Fish, Bird, Moon, Snake, Heath, and a wildcard, the Question Mark.

The game has a feature known as "avalanche". Instead of spinning reels, the symbols in Gonzo's Quest fall into the reels. When a winning line is formed, its symbols explode and are replaced by new ones in another avalanche, allowing for the possibility of multiple payouts within a single spin. There are 20 different pay lines offered. The Free Fall feature awards bonus rounds when three or more bonus icons appear. Five such icons result in the top payout. Another version of the game, Gonzo’s Quest Megaways, has an increased payout to be between 64 and 117,649.

Virtual Reality 
NetEnt announced in February 2017 that they would release a Virtual reality version of Gonzo's Quest. At the 2017 International Casinos Exhibition at the NetEnt stand you could play a demo VR version of Gonzo’s Quest. NetEnt announced then that the complete game would be in 3D with all the trimmings and would be released in 2018.

References

External links 

Gambling games
Slot machines